This is a list of diplomatic missions in Dubai. There are currently 73 consulates and commercials offices in the city. Most countries also have an embassy in the capital Abu Dhabi.

Consulates General

Other posts 
 (Delegation)
 Commercial Office
 Commercial Office
 Commercial Office

See also
 List of diplomatic missions in the United Arab Emirates

References

 
Diplomatic missions in Dubai